The 2017 Zippo 200 at The Glen was the 20th stock car race of the 2017 NASCAR Xfinity Series season and the 23rd iteration of the event. The race was held on Saturday, August 5, 2017, in Watkins Glen, New York at Watkins Glen International, a 2.45-mile (3.94 km) permanent road course. The race took the scheduled 82 laps to complete. At race's end, Kyle Busch, driving for Joe Gibbs Racing, would dominate the late stages of the race to win his 90th career NASCAR Xfinity Series win and his fourth win of the season. To fill out the podium, Joey Logano and Brad Keselowski, both driving for Team Penske, would finish second and third, respectively.

Background 

Watkins Glen International (nicknamed "The Glen") is an automobile race track located in Watkins Glen, New York at the southern tip of Seneca Lake. It was long known around the world as the home of the Formula One United States Grand Prix, which it hosted for twenty consecutive years (1961–1980), but the site has been home to road racing of nearly every class, including the World Sportscar Championship, Trans-Am, Can-Am, NASCAR Sprint Cup Series, the International Motor Sports Association and the IndyCar Series.

Initially, public roads in the village were used for the race course. In 1956 a permanent circuit for the race was built. In 1968 the race was extended to six hours, becoming the 6 Hours of Watkins Glen. The circuit's current layout has more or less been the same since 1971, although a chicane was installed at the uphill Esses in 1975 to slow cars through these corners, where there was a fatality during practice at the 1973 United States Grand Prix. The chicane was removed in 1985, but another chicane called the "Inner Loop" was installed in 1992 after J.D. McDuffie's fatal accident during the previous year's NASCAR Winston Cup event.

The circuit is known as the Mecca of North American road racing and is a very popular venue among fans and drivers. The facility is currently owned by International Speedway Corporation.

Entry list 

 (R) denotes rookie driver.
 (i) denotes driver who is ineligible for series driver points.

Practice

First practice 
The first practice session was held on Friday, August 4, at 12:00 PM EST. The session would last for 55 minutes.

Second and final practice 
The final practice session, sometimes known as Happy Hour, was held on Friday, August 4, at 2:30 PM EST. The session would last for 55 minutes.

Qualifying 
Qualifying was held on Saturday, August 5, at 11:05 AM EST. Since Watkins Glen International is a road course, the qualifying system was a multi-car system that included two rounds. The first round was 25 minutes, where every driver would be able to set a lap within the 25 minutes. Then, the second round would consist of the fastest 12 cars in Round 1, and drivers would have 10 minutes to set a lap. Whoever set the fastest time in Round 2 would win the pole.

Full qualifying results

Race results 
Stage 1 Laps: 20 

Stage 2 Laps: 20 

Stage 3 Laps: 42

Standings after the race 

Drivers' Championship standings

Note: Only the first 12 positions are included for the driver standings.

References 

2017 NASCAR Xfinity Series
NASCAR races at Watkins Glen International
August 2017 sports events in the United States
2017 in sports in New York (state)